This is a list of Riverview Old Ignatians. "Old Ignatians" are alumni of Saint Ignatius' College, Riverview in Sydney, a Roman Catholic school in New South Wales, Australia, run by the Jesuits.

Academia 
 Professor Athanasius Treweek Professor of Classics at University of Sydney, cracked Japanese code in World War II

Rhodes Scholars 

 Tony Abbott , BEc, LLBRhodes Scholar 1981, Prime Minister of Australia (2013-2015), Adviser to the UK Board of Trade since 2020
 Attila Brungs , BScRhodes Scholar 1994, Vice-Chancellor of the University of Technology Sydney since 2014
 Terence Glasheen, BA Rhodes Scholar 1938
 Imre Hunyor BSc, MB, BS Rhodes Scholar 2005
 Michael Izzo BA, LLB Rhodes Scholar 2000
 Christopher Martin BE Rhodes Scholar 1990
 Greg O'Mahoney BA, LLB Rhodes Scholar 2002

Business 
 John Kaldor  (1936– )a textiles industrialist and a significant Australian philanthropist renown for his support of the arts
 Paul Ramsay  (1936–2014)billionaire, founder of Ramsay Health Care, and a significant Australian philanthropist
 Andrew Todd (1904–1976)leading New Zealand businessmen; also attended Christian Brothers School, Dunedin; member of one of the richest families in New Zealand
 Sir Bryan Todd (1902–1987)leading New Zealand businessmen; also attended Christian Brothers School, Dunedin; member of one of the richest families in New Zealand

Clergy 
 Rev Fr Edmund Campion (OR1950)Professor at St Patrick's Seminary, Manly (until the mid-1990s); author and historian
 Fr John Brendan Casey SJ (1909–1985)priest and educationist; Rector of Riverview (1949–1954)
 Rev Fr Steve Curtin SJ (OR1974)Provincial of the Australian Province of the Society of Jesus (2008–2013); Director of Jesuit Mission Australia (2001–2008)
 Most Rev Anthony Fisher OP (OR1977) Archbishop of Sydney since 2014; Bishop of Parramatta Diocese (2010–2014); Auxiliary Bishop of Archdiocese of Sydney (2003–2010)

Entertainment, media and the creative arts

Dramatic arts

 Bob Connollyjournalist and award-winning documentary film maker and author
 Ben FordhamChannel Nine and 2 GB radio and cameraman for the dispute between Michael Clark and Karl Stefanovic.
 Colin Higgins writer and film director Harold and Maude, Silver Streak, Nine to Five, Foul Play, etc. 
 Marc McDermottactor on stage and screen
 Gregan McMahonactor and theatrical producer
 Reuben Mouradpresenter on Network Ten's Breakfast and 5 pm National News
 Andrew O'Keefepresenter of the Seven Network's Deal or No Deal and Weekend Sunrise; former intellectual property lawyer
 Rob Palmerpresenter on Seven Network's Better Homes and Gardens programme

Literary arts
 Christopher Brennanpoet (also attended St Aloysius' College)
 Nick Enrightdramatist/playwright
 Justin Flemingdramatist/playwright
 Robert Hughesart critic and writer
 Padraic "P. P." McGuinnessconservative journalist; editor of Quadrant Magazine
 Gerard Windsorwriter

Music 
 Rob Douganmusic producer and composer best known for the track "Clubbed to Death", which featured in The Matrix
 James Huntpercussionist for Rüfüs Du Sol
 Ignatius Jonesactor/musician; creative director of Sydney 2000 Olympic Opening Ceremony and ViViD Festival
 Tyrone Lindqvistvocalist and guitarist for Rüfüs Du Sol
 Thomas O'Delllead vocalist of the band DMA's, best known for their song 'Delete' and cover of Cher's Believe

Visual arts
 Michael Arthur Macdonald Scott (1910–1990)former Jesuit priest and educator, co-founder of the Blake prize for religious art and trustee of the National Gallery of Victoria

Other
 Maurice O'Sheawinemaker and CEO of Brazzers.

Law 

 Tom Bathurst Current Chief Justice of New South Wales
 George Ernest Flannery (1872–1945)barrister who worked with Sir Edmund Barton for Federation and was a foundation member of the Old Ignatians' Union
 Peter GarlingJustice of the NSW Supreme Court, 2010 – present
 Clifton Hoeben Current Chief Judge in Common Law, NSW Supreme Court (Judge since 2004, Chief Judge since 2012); Major-General of the Australian Army Reserve
 Julian McMahon (barrister)- Bali 9 lawyer
 Sir Henry Edward Manning (1877–1963)barrister and politician. Attorney-General of New South Wales.
 Anthony Meagher is a current Justice of the Court of Appeal of the Supreme Court of New South Wales 
 Roderick Meagher Justice of the NSW Supreme Court and Court of Appeal, 1989–2004
 George Palmer Justice of the Supreme Court of New South Wales, 2001–2011; musical composer

Medicine and science

Medicine
 Dr Walter Burfitt surgeon and co-founder of the Royal Australasian College of Surgeons; Founder of the Medical Benevolent Association of New South Wales (also attended St Aloysius' College)

Sciences

 Richard Dowdennoted geo- and astrophysicist
 Paul Scully-Powerfirst Australian born astronaut – Space Shuttle Challenger 1984

Military 
 Major Dr. Kevin Faganphysician and World War II hero
 Clifton HoebenMajor General and NSW Supreme Court Judge
 Michael SlatteryRear Admiral and NSW Supreme Court Judge

Politics and public service

Politicians
 Tony Abbott , BEc, LLBRhodes Scholar 1981, Prime Minister of Australia (2013-2015), Adviser to the UK Board of Trade since 2020
 David Connolly (1974–1996)former Federal Member for Bradfield, representing the Liberals 
 Thomas Bartholomew Curran (1870–1929)former member of Britain's House of Commons
 Jason Falinski MPFederal Member for Mackellar since 2016, representing the Liberals 
 Joe Francis MLAState Member for Jandakot; Lieutenant, Royal Australian Navy
 Dr David Gillespie MPFederal Member for Lyne, representing the Nationals; and a former gastroenterologist
 Nick Greiner Premier of New South Wales (1988–1992); State Member for Ku-ring-gai (1980-1992), representing the Liberals
 Chris Hartcher MPState Member for Terrigal and former Member for Gosford, representing the Liberals and now an Independent
 Tom Hughes barrister; Federal Member for Parkes (1963–1969), Federal Member for Berowra (1969–1972); Former Attorney-General of Australia (1969–1971)
 Peter JohnsonFederal Member for Brisbane (1975–1980), representing the Liberals
 Barnaby Joyce MPFederal Member for New England, representing the Nationals; a former Deputy Prime Minister of Australia (2016–2017, 2017–2018)
 Matt Kean MPState Member for Hornsby, representing the Liberals
 Stephen LusherFederal Member for Hume (1974–84), representing the Nationals
 Jonathan O'DeaMPState Member for Davidson, representing the Liberals
 Anthony RobertsMPState Member for Lane Cove, representing the Liberals

Public service 
 Michael Coutts-Trottersenior New South Wales public servant, currently Secretary of the NSW Department of Communities and Justice since 2019
 Lachlan HarrisSenior Press Secretary to former Prime Minister Kevin Rudd

Sport

AFL 
 Craig Nettelbeck Sydney Swans 1990-94, Fremantle 1995, Melbourne 1996-98
 Jed AndersonHawthorn Hawks 2013-
 Leo BarrySydney Swans 1995–2009 – AFL Premiership winning player 2005
 Josh BruceGreater Western Sydney Giants 2012-
 Malcolm LynchWestern Bulldogs 2007–2009, North Melbourne Football Club 2012
 Dan Robinson

Cricket 
 Jackson BirdAustralian Test Cricketer 2012 –, Tasmanian Tigers 2011 –, Melbourne Stars 2012 –, Sheffield Shield 'Player of the Year' 2011–2012, Australia A 2012
 John Davison Canadian Cricketer 2001–11.
Sam Fanning Western Australia 2022

Football 
 Callum Elder Leicester City F.C. 2013–2019. Hull City A.F.C 2019 - present.
Adam Biddleplayed soccer for Sydney FC In addition to such accolades, is also father to Liam Biddle

Rowing
 Bryan Curtin  Olympian, Munich 1972 M8+.
 Richard Curtin  Olympian, Munich 1972 M8+.
 Joe Donnelly  Australian representative coxswain (1974–75) M8+ and National Rowing Coach, Vietnam.
 Simon Nola  silver medallist at World Rowing Championships 2013 LM8+.
 Daniel Noonan dual Olympian, Beijing 2008 M4X and London 2012 M4X bronze medallist.

Rugby Union

State/Provincial/National 
 Bryan Hughes Wallabies 1913, (2 Caps), Christchurch, NZ
 Charles Morrissey Wallabies 1925–26,(5 Caps) Sydney, NSW
 Ignatius O'Donnell Wallabies 1899 (2 Caps), Sydney, NSW
 James Hughes Wallabies 1907 (2 Caps), Sydney, NSW
 James O'Donnell Wallabies 1899 (1 Cap), Sydney, NSW
 John "Jack" Manning Wallabies 1904 (1 Cap), Great Britain 
 Jack DempseyWallabies 2017–Present, NSW Waratahs 2015 - Present, Australian Schoolboys 2012, Australian U20 2013-2014
 Mitch InmanWestern Force 2011, Melbourne Rebels 2012, Wallabies training squad 2012
 Jono JenkinsNSW Waratahs 2012, Western Force 2010, Australian Rugby Sevens 2009
 Jim LenehanWallabies 1958–1967, (24 Caps), Sydney, NSW
 Lachlan McCaffreyNSW Waratahs 2010, Western Force 2012, ACT Brumbies 2013
 David McDulingQueensland Reds 2012–2015, Australian Under 20s Rugby World Cup 2009 Natal/Durban Sharks 2015-
 Angus RobertsMelbourne Rebels 2013
 Michael WellsACT Brumbies 2016 NSW Waratahs 2017-2019 and Melbourne Rebels 2020–present, Australian Schoolboys 2010 - 2011 Australia U20's 2013 Rugby World Cup Australia Sevens 2014-2015 2018-2019 Wallabies squad 2021 French Test Series
 Robert Westfield Wallabies 1928-29 (6 Caps), Sydney, NSW
 Tom Coolican USA Eagles 2018–Present

Rugby Sevens 
 Henry HutchisonWorld Rugby Sevens Series Rookie Player of the Year 2015/16
 Ed JenkinsAustralian Rugby Sevens Captain 2012

Olympians 
 Frederick LaneAustralia's first Olympic swimmer, Paris 1900, he took gold in the 200 metres freestyle and the 200 metres obstacle race
 Michael Delany Swimming 1984 Los Angeles 4 x 100 metre Freestyle Relay (Silver Medal) - The 'Mean Machine'
 Daniel NoonanAustralian Olympic rower, men's quad scull in Beijing 2008 (fourth place), also London 2012 (bronze medal).
 Ed FernonModern pentathlon 2012 London Olympics
 Aidan RoachWater polo 2012 London Olympics, 2016 Rio Olympics
 Will RyanSailing 2016 Rio Olympics 470 Class (Silver Medal) and 2020 Tokyo Olympics 470 Class (Gold Medal)

Other 
 Richard Walshprofessional mixed martial artist and UFC competitor

References

External links 
 Saint Ignatius' College, Riverview Website
 Old Ignatians Union
 Old Ignatians Rugby Club
 University of Sydney Registrar
 Australian Rugby 
 Australian Rugby 

Riverview Old Ignatians
Riverview, St Ignatius
Riverview Old Ignatians